Sub-Lingual Tablet  is the 30th and penultimate studio album by English band The Fall, released in May 2015 by Cherry Red Records.

The album was originally going to be named Dedication Not Medication, but, according to Mark E. Smith, "it looked a bit like a Barclays advert". Sub-Lingual Tablet marks the first appearance of second drummer Daren Garratt as a full-time member (he previously guested on The Remainderer, uncredited). Meanwhile, "Black Roof" doesn't feature the regular Fall lineup at all; instead, the bulk of it was recorded by former members Rob Barbato and Tim Presley in the United States, with Smith adding the vocals later.

Two of the album's tracks were already released in 2014 in different versions – "Fibre Book Troll" on Modeselektor's Modeselektion Vol. 03 compilation and "Auto Chip 2014-2016" (as "Auto (2014) Chip Replace") on part-live, part-studio album Live: Uurop VIII-XII Places In Sun & Winter, Son.

Reception

Michael Hann of The Guardian gave the album three stars out of five, calling it "predictable and surprising in almost equal measure"; he criticised the album for having "its share of Fall-by-numbers" but also described "Auto Chip 2014-2016" as "magnificent". Chris McCall of The Skinny said that it was "easily the [band's] best [album] since 2007's Reformation Post TLC". Drowned in Sound reviewer Benjamin Bland said that while the album contained "a series of tracks that could fit into almost any period in the band's catalogue", it included "enough genuinely high quality Fall material" to be of interest to old and new fans alike.

Track listing

CD version

Vinyl version
The double-vinyl version was released on May 25 and contains alternate versions of several tracks, most notably longer versions of "Dedication Not Medication" and "Fibre Book Troll", and shorter versions of "Auto Chip 2014-2016" and "Pledge!"

Personnel
Credits adapted from Sub-Lingual Tablet liner notes.

The Fall
 Mark E. Smith – vocals, guitar on "First One Today", production
 Peter Greenway – guitar
 Elena Poulou – synthesizer, engineering
 David Spurr – bass guitar
 Keiron Melling – drums, engineering
 Daren Garratt – drums, percussion, backing vocals on "Auto Chip 2014-2016"

Additional personnel

 Rob Barbato – all instruments, recording and mixing on "Black Roof"
 Tim Presley – all instruments, recording and mixing on "Black Roof"
 Simon "Ding" Archer – engineering, voice on "Dedication Not Medication" (vinyl version)
 Mat Arnold – engineering
 Andy Pearce – mastering
 Ken Pearson – artwork
 Charlie Pearson – artwork

Charts

References

External links
https://itunes.apple.com/gb/album/sub-lingual-tablet/id977365325

2015 albums
The Fall (band) albums
Cherry Red Records albums